Riccardo Minasi (born 1978) is an Italian violinist and conductor in the field of historically informed performance.

Life 
Born in Rome, Minasi received his first music lessons from his mother, studying modern violin with Paolo Centurioni and Alfredo Fiorentini. He then turned to the baroque violin and its repertoire, his teachers in this field being Enrico Parizzi and Luigi Mangiocavallo.

He was a soloist as well as concertmaster in numerous ensembles, such as the: Le Concert des Nations under Jordi Savall, the Accademia Bizantina, the Concerto Italiano, with Il Giardino Armonico, the Concerto Vocale Gent under René Jacobs, the Collegium 1704 and the Ensemble 415 under Chiara Banchini. Among the important musicians with whom he has performed are Enrico Onofri, Viktoria Mullova, Albrecht Mayer, Christophe Coin, Sergio Azzolini and Reinhard Goebel. In 2007 he founded the chamber music ensemble "Musica Antiqua Roma", with which he performs works of the 17th and 18th centuries. One focus is on the forgotten Roman composers from this period.

In 2009, Minasi received an appointment as historical advisor to the Orchestre symphonique de Montréal. In 2010, he served as assistant conductor and concertmaster for the Theater Dortmund production of the opera Norma by Bellini with the Balthasar Neumann Ensemble alongside Thomas Hengelbrock.

From 2004 to 2010, Minasi taught chamber music at the Vincenzo Bellini Conservatory in Palermo. He has taught master classes and courses for violin, chamber music and baroque orchestra at the Longy School of Music in Cambridge (US), the Sibelius Academy in Helsinki, the Chinese Culture University in Taipei, the Kùks Residence in the Czech Republic, the Conservatory of Sydney and the Scuola di Musica in Fiesole.

Minasi's works include violins attributed to the violin makers David Tecchler (1666-1748) and Amati (1623) are at his disposal.

Minasi was principal conductor of the ensemble Il pomo d'oro from its foundation in 2012 until 2015. The new orchestra already won prizes with its first recording - Vivaldi's L'imperatore - and in its founding year also edited solo albums by the countertenors Max Emanuel Cenčić, Franco Fagioli and Xavier Sabata, as well as an album with Venetian Barcarole. Since 2013, the ensemble has given guest performances in important houses throughout Europe, for example in the Theater an der Wien, Paris, Munich, London, St. Petersburg, Zurich and Barcelona.

In December 2016, Minasi was appointed chief conductor of the Mozarteum Orchestra, succeeding Ivor Bolton.

In September 2018, Minasi began working for two seasons as the Ensemble Resonanz's "Artist in Residence" at Hamburg's Elbphilharmonie. This collaboration has since been extended until 2024.

Many of the more than 20 CD recordings in which he has participated as a soloist have won recording awards.

Recordings 
 Heinrich Ignaz Biber, Rosenkranz-Sonaten (ARTS, 2006)
 Arcangelo Corelli's Legacy, Violinsonaten von Corelli und seinen Schülern (Passacaille, 2007)
 Francesco Veracini, Sonaten für Violine und Bc (Sony, 2009)
 Georg Friedrich Händel, Violin Sonatas (Sony, 2011)
 Antonio Vivaldi, Concerti per l’imperatore (Naïve, 2012)
 Bad Guys. Arien von Georg Friedrich Händel: Xavier Sabata, Il pomo d’oro (Aparte A048, harmonia mundi, 2013)
 Carl Philipp Emanuel Bach I 6 Hamburg Symphonies, Ensemble Resonanz, Label: Es-Dur (2014)
 Carl Philipp Emanuel Bach II, 4 Symphonies, Wq 183 – 6 Sonatas, Wq 184, Ensemble Resonanz, Label: Es-Dur (2016)
 Wolfgang Amadeus Mozart: Symphonien Nr. 39–41, Ensemble Resonanz, Label: harmonia mundi (2020)
 Giovanni Battista Pergolesi: Stabat Mater, Ensemble Resonanz, Label: harmonia mundi (2021)

References

External links 
  with curriculum vitae and numerous audio examples
 

Italian classical violinists
Italian conductors (music)
Italian performers of early music
1978 births
Living people
Musicians from Rome